Alkali Lake is a lake in the U.S. state of Nevada.

Alkali Lake was so named on account of it being a soda lake or "alkaline lake" (a lake with high alkalinity).

References

Lakes of Lander County, Nevada
Lakes of Pershing County, Nevada